Planolestes is a genus of beetles in the family Laemophloeidae, containing the following species:

 Planolestes brunneus Grouvelle
 Planolestes laevicornis Lefkovitch

References

Laemophloeidae